Zimbabwe Tribune is an internet based newspaper published in Zimbabwe and the UK. It has a specialised focus on current events in Zimbabwe's political  developments. The newspaper was launched in January 2009.

The Zimbabwe Tribune provides Internet-only aggregated political news and opinion articles focused on Zimbabwe politics.

History 
Zimbabwe Tribune was launched in January 2009 by 3MG Media which also publishes the Zimbabwe Daily News (ZimDaily), Zimbabwe Telegraph and Harare Tribune.

Circulation 
Zimbabwe Tribune is currently only an online edition. Its website is updated daily and accessible for free.

External links 
Zimbabwe Tribune

Free daily newspapers
Internet properties established in 2009
Newspapers published in Zimbabwe
African news websites